Cedar Township is the name of two places in the US state of Minnesota:

 Cedar Township, Marshall County, Minnesota
 Cedar Township, Martin County, Minnesota

See also
 Cedar Township (disambiguation)
Minnesota township disambiguation pages